Mukesh Sahani is an Indian politician from the Indian state of Bihar. He served as the Minister for Animal Husbandry & Fisheries in the Government of Bihar till 27 March 2022. He is the founder of the Vikassheel Insaan Party, a political party in Bihar. He previously worked as a Bollywood stage designer. Sahani is also owner of a company named 'Mukesh Cineworld Private Limited'.

Sahani campaigned for Bharatiya Janata Party during the 2015 Bihar Legislative Assembly election, but later formed Vikassheel Insaan Party and his party became part of Mahagathbandhan in Bihar for 2019 Indian general election. They contested three Lok Sabha seats but failed to win any seats.

Early life
Mukesh Sahani was born to Meena Devi and Jitan Sahani. Before entering into the Indian politics, he was a successful businessman in Bollywood Industry as a set designer. He left Bihar at the age of 19 and moved to Mumbai. In his initial times in Mumbai, he worked as a salesman and later joined Bollywood as a set designer. Mukesh is considered as an influential leader of  "Mallaah" (fisherman) community, he is also referred to as 'Son of Mallah'.

Social life
In the year 2010, Sahani started thinking about his society and community, he founded Sahani Samaj Kalyan Sanstha in Bihar. He opened two offices, one is in Darbhanga and another one is in Patna. Using this foundation, he has directed people to get well educated and gather in a circle. He was also educated to take interest in politics. In the year 2015, he founded an organisation named Nishad Vikas Sangh. This organization started working district wise to gather the community people.

Political career
He was observed by Mr. Narendra Modi and he picked him up. Sahani started campaigning for the BJP. Finally, BJP won 2014 Lok Sabha Election. However, Mr. Sahani left BJP because they did not deliver the promise of approving his community in Schedule Caste category. Later he founded a Sangh named as [Nishad Vikas Sangh] in 2015. In 2018, he formed a party as well with the name of Vikassheel Insaan Party. The party was approved on 26 July 2018. The VIP Party of Sahani contested 2019 General Elections as an alliance in the Mahagathbandhan or the Grand Alliance. It failed to win any seats in the elections. Later in the 2020 Legislative Elections, his party established its place in Bihar by winning four seats. In the Bihar election of 2020, his party fought along with NDA.

Personal life
Mukesh Sahani is married to Kavita Sahani, a full time Home Maker. They have two children, Ranveer & Muskan. Mukesh Sahani has a brother,  Santosh Sahani and a sister, Rinku Sahani.

References

Notes

Citations

External links 
 

Living people
Vikassheel Insaan Party politicians
People from Khagaria district
Indian production designers
State cabinet ministers of Bihar
Members of the Bihar Legislative Council
1981 births